Andrea Corbari (born 26 April 1994) is an Italian professional footballer who plays as a centre back for  club Virtus Entella.

Club career
Born in Cremona, Corbari started his career on amateur USD Pallavicino.

In 2020 he joined to Serie C club Piacenza. He was named captain of the team. On 12 February 2021, he renewed his contract still 2023. In December 2021, Corbari suffered an ACL injury which kept him off the field for the remainder of the 2021–22 season.

On 15 July 2022, Corbari signed with Virtus Entella.

References

External links
 
 

1994 births
Living people
Sportspeople from Cremona
Footballers from Lombardy
Italian footballers
Association football defenders
Serie C players
Serie D players
Eccellenza players
Promozione players
U.S. Fiorenzuola 1922 S.S. players
Piacenza Calcio 1919 players
Virtus Entella players